James Richard Tracy (born 1970) is an American author, poet and activist living in Oakland, California. He is the co-author (with Amy Sonnie) of Hillbilly Nationalists, Urban Race Rebels and Black Power: Community Organizing in Radical Times (Melville House Publishers 2012).

Early life

Tracy was born in Oakland, California in 1970. His family moved shortly thereafter to Vallejo, California. His father was a kindergarten teacher in the Richmond Unified School District. His mother worked a variety of jobs in the social work field. Tracy has two younger brothers.

Tracy credits several formative events in shaping his early political outlook. His first job was as a paper delivery person for the Vallejo Independent Press, a worker-owned newspaper founded by striking newspaper workers. This introduced the idea of worker self-management to him. In early 1989, the presence of Neo-Nazi organizers in Vallejo helped him form an anti-racist commitment.

Housing organizing
In 1992, Tracy co-founded the Eviction Defense Network (EDN) an organization which utilized direct action to prevent evictions.  The EDN was invited to work alongside public housing residents organizing for the right-of-return in the federal HOPE VI program. Subsequently, he was a member of the Coalition On Homelessness, Mission Agenda, and the Mission Anti-Displacement Coalition.

Published work
 The Civil Disobedience Handbook: A Brief History and Practical Guide for the Politically Disenchanted  (Manic D Press, 2001)
  The Military Draft Handbook: A Brief History and Practical Guide for the Curious and Confused  (Manic D Press, 2005)
  Molotov Mouths Outspoken Word Troupe: Explosive New Writing  (Manic D Press, 2003)
  Avanti Popolo: Italian Americans Sail Beyond Columbus  (co-editor) (Manic D Press, 2008)
  Sparks and Codes (Civil Defense Poetry, 2007)
  Hillbilly Nationalists, Urban Race Rebels and Black Power: Community Organizing in Radical Times  (Melville House Publishers, 2012)
  Dispatches Against Displacement: Field Notes From San Francisco's Housing Wars  (AK Press, 2014)
 No Fascist USA!: The John Brown Anti-Klan Committee and Lessons for Today’s Movements (co-authored with Hilary Moore) (City Lights Publishers, 2020)

Anthologies and encyclopedia entries
 “A Decade of Displacement,” The Political Edge, City Lights Publishers, 2009.
 “Rising Up: Poor, White and Angry in the New Left”, The Hidden 1970s, Histories of Radicalism Rutgers Press, 2010.
 “Henry David Thoreau,” Encyclopedia of Activism and Social Justice, New York University Press, February 2007.
 “Housing Movements,” Encyclopedia of Activism and Social Justice, New York University Press, February 2007.
 “Young Patriots Organization,” Encyclopedia of Activism and Social Justice, New York University Press, February 2007.

References

External links 
 
 "Recipes For Recovery" (Yes Magazine, 2011)
 "A World Of Possibilities at 45 Westpoint" (Processed World, 2005)
 "Amnesia: President Ronald Reagan RIP" (Z Magazine, 2004)

1970 births
Writers from Oakland, California
Living people
Activists from the San Francisco Bay Area
American male writers
Writers from Vallejo, California